The Presidents' Conference Committee Car was a streetcar used by the Toronto Transportation Commission and the Toronto Transit Commission. The PCC streetcar was designed by the Presidents' Conference Committee, a group of transit operators in the United States and Canada.

The TTC purchased 745 PCC streetcars in all, making it the largest PCC fleet in North America. Of that, 317 were air-electric (with air-compressor) and 428 all-electric (no air-compressor); 540 ordered new and 205 used (from several U.S. operators abandoning streetcar service). 175 PCCs had couplers for multiple-unit operation, and the TTC used them to assemble 2-car PCC trains. The TTC had only a maximum of 744 PCCs in service because car 4063 was scrapped after it derailed and crashed into Lansdowne Carhouse wall on 20 January 1947. Today, only two PCCs remain in Toronto, bearing the original 1951 fleet numbers of 4500 and 4549, for charters and special events.

Most of the PCCs were scrapped, with some becoming stationary structures such as restaurants, shops or farm sheds. Other retired TTC PCC cars were purchased for preservation by other organizations, such as rail museums, a few of which continue to operate Toronto PCCs on their own museum rail lines. Five former Toronto cars continue to operate on the Kenosha Electric Railway, a new heritage streetcar line, in Kenosha, Wisconsin.

Fleet
The TTC had two broad types of PCCs: Air-electric and all-electric. Air-electric PCCs were built until 1945; all-electrics after 1945. Air-electrics used an air system to operate doors and brakes while the all-electrics had no air functions as all its components were electrically operated. The all-electrics had a different styling that usually made them easily distinguishable from air-electrics. A major visual difference was that the all-electrics (except the former Kansas City PCCs, A14-class) had standee windows, which none of the air-electrics had.

The TTC ordered 100 air-electrics (A7-class) with couplers for two-car multiple-unit operation. Later it installed couplers on 75 PCCs purchased second-hand from Cleveland (classes A11 and A12). MU-trains operated during the rush hours on the Bloor streetcar line between 1950 and 1966, and on the Queen streetcar line, today's 501 Queen, between the Neville and Humber loops, from 1967 to early 1977. The theory was that a two-car train could load/unload at a stop and pass through an intersection as fast as a single car. In 1960, there were 55 PCC-trains operating on the Bloor line operating on frequencies as little as 129 seconds. Two-car trains could only be run on lines specially prepared for such operation. Trains had two trolley poles contacting the overhead; thus, necessary-action contacts on the overhead wire had to be relocated. (NA-contacts relay an operator command to change a track switch setting.) Neville Park Loop on the Queen streetcar line (today 501 Queen) had to be rebuilt to broader radius to handle two-car trains.

New purchases 

The first PCC acquisitions, classes A1 to A8, were for new PCCs, with each class representing a separate order to the manufacturer. PCCs ordered new by the TTC were built in Montreal, Quebec by Canadian Car and Foundry under license from the St. Louis Car Company of St. Louis, Missouri. The car body shells and trucks were fabricated by St. Louis Car Company, and shipped to Canadian Car and Foundry, who then installed the components and completed the cars.

Initially, the first 3 PCC classes were numbered PC1, PC2 and PC3. However, by 1944, they would be renamed to A1, A2 and A3.

The first order for PCCs (class PC1, later renamed as A1) was placed in March 1938 for 140 air-electric cars. At this time, this was the largest PCC order placed to date in North America, although it would be surpassed by a later order from Chicago. They replaced 27 wooden former TRC cars and 30 3-door class Q "Harvey" trailers. The new PCCs first went into service on 23 September 1938 along the St. Clair streetcar line (today's 512 St. Clair).

In the fall of 1940, the TTC ordered 50 class PC2 (later A2) cars. The PC2 cars went into service on 24 September 1940 along the King streetcar line (today 504 King). The TTC retired 30 more former TRC cars and another 30 Harvey trailers.

By March 1942, the TTC received its third PCC order (class PC3, later A3) of 60 cars. This class had technological improvements over the first two classes such as super-resilient wheels.

In March 1942, the TTC wanted to order 60 more PCCs. However, due to war-time rationing, it received only 15, arriving in January and February 1944. These class A4 cars were assigned to the St. Clair Carhouse, and boosted service on existing lines. The final 25 air-electric PCCs that the TTC ordered (class A5) arrived in 1945. Because of war-time shortages, both class A4 and A5 cars had lower quality components for passenger fixtures, that were replaced after the war. The A5 cars permitted the replacement of Peter Witt streetcars on the Dupont streetcar line.

The next three PCC orders came after the war, and were for all-electric PCCs. The TTC wanted to retire its 195 remaining wooden former TRC cars built between 1911 and 1917.

The TTC ordered its first 100 all-electric PCC cars in May 1946. These A6 cars arrived from December 1947 to the spring of 1948. The new cars were assigned to the Bloor and Carlton (today 506 Carlton) routes displacing their air-electric cars to other routes.

The next order (to become the A7 class) were for 100 multiple-unit PCCs to be assigned to the busy Bloor streetcar line. These cars would later be supplemented by second-hand cars from Cleveland (classes A11 and A12) fitted with couplers.

The final order the TTC made for new PCC cars was delivered in 1951. There were only 50 cars purchased for class A8 because by this time new PCCs were much more expensive to buy. The A8 class was the third last order for new PCCs in North America, with only orders from Boston and San Francisco remaining to be completed.  The arrival of the A8 class provided enough streetcars to retire the last of the wooden, class BB streetcars that the TTC inherited from the Toronto Railway Company in 1921.

Second-hand purchases
In 1951, the TTC still had 348 Peter Witt cars and 105 trailers. Since the Yonge streetcar line used only 70 Peter Witt trailer trains, the opening of the Yonge subway (part of today's Line 1 Yonge–University) in 1954 would in itself not allow the retirement of the remaining Peter Witt fleet. The TTC wished to avoid the high cost of buying new PCCs; thus, it had started to search for second-hand PCCs from U.S. transit operators closing out streetcar operations.

In 1950, the TTC acquired 50 all-electric PCCs (class A9) and 27 older air-electrics (class A10) from the Cincinnati Street Railway. Both sets of former Cincinnati cars were built by the St. Louis Car Company. In Cincinnati, these cars all had two trolley poles like for a trolley bus. The TTC removed one of the two poles.

In 1952, the TTC purchased 75 all-electric PCCs from the Cleveland Transit System. Fifty were built by Pullman-Standard becoming class A11 (dubbed "Cleveland"), and twenty-five by the St. Louis Car Company becoming class A12 ("Louisville"). Each class had roof housing for fan equipment, a feature which the TTC chose to disable. The housing gave the cars a distinctive appearance, with each class having a distinctively different style of housing. The A12 former Louisville cars were built for the Louisville Railway Company but were never put into service there. The cars were sold to the Cleveland Transit System as deliveries to Louisville were being made, the last 10 of the 25 "Louisville" cars being shipped directly to Cleveland.

Also in 1952, the TTC purchased 48 all-electric PCCs from the Birmingham Electric Company. These class A13 ("Birmingham") cars were built by Pullman-Standard. In Birmingham, Alabama, these PCCs had the notoriety of having racially-segregated seating, a practice that ceased with their shipment to Toronto.

In 1957, the TTC purchased 30 all-electric PCCs from the Kansas City Public Service Company, and became class A14 ("Kansas City"). These are the only all-electric PCCs not to have standee windows as the president of Kansas City Public Service wanted "none of those little apertures". The A14 cars supported only one-piece front rollsigns. Because of this, the A14 cars would show only destinations for the St. Clair and Earlscourt routes (today 512 St. Clair) effectively confining the A14 cars to the St. Clair streetcar line.

The "Kansas City" PCCs became the TTC's final purchase of second-hand PCC streetcars. At this time, only Mexico City had more second-hand PCCs.

The TTC had to modify all its second-hand PCCs to its standards. The work included:
 Regauging to TTC gauge.
 Adding Necessary Action circuits (an exclusively Toronto feature) to activate track switches.
 Removing or sealing (A14) backup controls.
 Removing one of the two poles from the former Cincinnati cars (A9 & A10).
 Adding treadle-operation to A9, A11, A12 and A13 cars.
 Modifying doors to fold outward, if not so configured.
 Adding the green advance light on the roof above the front rollsigns.
 Removing ventilation fans from A11 and A12 cars.
 Adding two couplers each to A11 and A12 cars.

By 1958, there were still 132 Peter Witt streetcars in service despite the presence of 744 PCC streetcars. The opening of the University subway extension (part of today's Line 1 Yonge–University) in 1963, and the closure of the Oakwood and Dupont streetcar lines ended Peter Witt operation, making the Toronto streetcar fleet 100% PCC.

Class A15 and retirement
In the late 1980s, as CLRVs (Canadian Light Rail Vehicle) were replacing the aging PCC fleet, the TTC started to create a new class of PCC cars, the A15 class, by rebuilding A8-class cars for use on the then-new Harbourfront streetcar line (part of today's 509 Harbourfront route). The refurbishment program was cancelled in 1991 following an edict by the Metropolitan Toronto government that all future vehicle purchases must be accessible; all 19 PCCs were rebuilt, with the last car outshopped in 1992. However, in 1995, the A15 class PCCs were retired because the new CLRV fleet could handle the ridership, which had declined by that time.

The class A15 cars were numbered 4600–4618; however, two cars (4604 and 4605) were painted with their original A8-class numbers for historical accuracy. Thus, officially they were 4604 and 4605, but publicly they were known as 4500 and 4549, respectively. These two cars were classified as A15H ("H" for "historical") and were restored as closely as possible to their original condition. These are the only two PCCs remaining in Toronto, and they are used for charters and special events.

Rail grinder trains

The TTC constructed two rail grinder trains from two pairs of PCC cars retired from passenger service. One train was adapted for the subway system and the other was for the streetcar system.

In 1970, the TTC converted two class A7 PCCs (4446 and 4410) into a subway rail grinder train (renumbering the cars as RT-14 and RT-15). The cars were modified for the third-rail based subway system. The two cars were operated coupled back-to-back, and operators could access either car from within the train. The front two doors were modified so that one door opened at platform level while the other opened closer to the ground. A centre platform-level door was added on the left side of each car. The original centre doors and many of the windows of the former streetcars were blocked off. This train was retired in 1989.

About 1974, the TTC converted two class A11 PCCs (4631 and 4668) into a streetcar system rail grinder train (renumbering the cars as W-30 and W-31). W-31 had its brake shoes replaced by rail grinding blocks. W-30 pulled the train and provided braking power. The train's last rail grinding job was in 1999; in 2002, the two cars were donated to the Halton County Radial Railway.

Summary
These PCCs made up the TTC fleet:

Timeline

Disposals
After their retirement, several of the TTC's PCCs were sold for different purposes.

Continued operation
The following PCC cars were sold to other cities for continued operations:

Preservation
Some museums, such as the Halton County Radial Railway, the Edmonton Radial Railway Society and the National Capital Trolley Museum have preserved Toronto PCCs in working order so that museum visitors can ride them.

Commemoration

A pair of enamel murals by Gerald Zeldin entitled Summertime Streetcar are displayed at platform level at Eglinton West station. They depict a stylized PCC car, albeit in Kansas City colours.

The San Francisco Municipal Railway (MUNI) painted its PCC 1074 in TTC livery "to honor Toronto"; it runs on the Market Street Railway. However, this car never operated in Toronto: it was originally built for Minneapolis' Twin City Rapid Transit and ultimately bought by MUNI.

See also
 Canadian Light Rail Vehicle (replacement for the PCCs)
 PCC streetcar
 Toronto streetcar system
 Toronto Transit Commission
 Trams

References

External links

 A History Of Toronto's Presidents' Conference Committee Cars (The PCCs), a series of articles published by Transit Toronto
 Toronto Transit Commission PCC Cars (rosters)
 Preserved Toronto PCCs as per Branford Electric Railway Association database

Toronto streetcar vehicles